Mehdi Taghavi Kermani (born February 20, 1987, in Savadkuh) is an Iranian wrestler.  Taghavi was the favorite to win the 2012 London Olympics but was upset in the first round by Cuba's Liván López who ended up winning the bronze.  Taghavi had previously beaten Lopez at the 2011 World Wrestling Championships.

At the 2008 Summer Olympics, he beat Haislan Garcia in the first round, before losing to Ramazan Şahin in the quarterfinals.  As Şahin went on to the final, Taghavi took part in the bronze medal repechage where he lost to Geandry Garzón.

References

External links
 

1987 births
Living people
Iranian male sport wrestlers
Olympic wrestlers of Iran
Wrestlers at the 2008 Summer Olympics
Wrestlers at the 2012 Summer Olympics
Asian Games silver medalists for Iran
Asian Games medalists in wrestling
Wrestlers at the 2010 Asian Games
World Wrestling Champions
People from Savadkuh
Medalists at the 2010 Asian Games
Asian Wrestling Championships medalists
Sportspeople from Mazandaran province
20th-century Iranian people
21st-century Iranian people